Divas of Disco is a live video album recorded on April 25, 2007, at Avalon, Hollywood, performed by CeCe Peniston, Thelma Houston, Linda Clifford, A Taste of Honey and France Joli. The whole concert was issued on CD in 2010.

The work was released in 2008 on ZYX Music for Europe, including bonus material (biographies and backstage interviews with singers), while in the United States on RSM Records in 2009.

Track listings

Credits and personnel 

 Linda Clifford - lead vocal
 Janice Marie Johnson - lead vocal
 Thelma Houston - lead vocal
 France Joli - lead vocal
 CeCe Peniston - lead vocal
 Jean McClain - back vocal
 Sabrina Sloan - back vocal
 Reggie Thornton - dancer
 Rodney Houston - dancer
 Ed Roth - music director, piano
 Bryant Simpson - bass guitar
 Linda Taylor - guitar
 Billy Steinway - keyboards
 Mitch Waddell - audio remix

 Damita Jo Freeman - choreography
 Michael Chernow - executive producer
 David Brainard - film director
 Joel Huxtable - lighting director
 Damon Gold - remote audio
 Videolines - remote facility
 Don Tartaro - production manager
 Ann-Riley Caldwell - stage manager
 Stephen Ford - talent coordinator
 Robert Tarango - contractor
 Alfonso Saldana - limo transportation
 LaVerne Tate - hair
 Rudy Calvo - make up
 Allen Mercer - photography

CD release

Unlike the DVD album, its CD equivalent missed additional tracks ("Runaway Love" by Linda Clifford, "Love and Happiness" by Thelma Houston, and "Heart to Break the Heart" by France Joli).

The album included Peniston's two number-one dance hits in the US, "Finally" and "Keep On Walkin'", and her cover version of Donna Summer's 1978 hit song, "Last Dance".

"Keep On Walkin'" was earlier issued as the virtual lead track of the Peniston digital "EP Live", released by One Media Publishing in 2008. In addition, a three track EP was available in CD-r format since January 14, 2011.

Track listing

Credits and personnel

 Linda Clifford - lead vocal
 Janice Marie Johnson - lead vocal
 Thelma Houston - lead vocal
 France Joli - lead vocal
 CeCe Peniston - lead vocal
 Jean McClain - back vocal
 Sabrina Sloan - back vocal
 Ed Roth - music director, piano
 Bryant Simpson - bass guitar
 Linda Taylor - guitar
 Billy Steinway - keyboards
 Mitch Waddell - audio remix

References 

General

Specific

2010 live albums
CeCe Peniston live albums
CeCe Peniston video albums
Thelma Houston albums
France Joli albums
A Taste of Honey (band) albums